The women's downhill competition of the PyeongChang 2018 Olympics was held at the Jeongseon Alpine Centre in PyeongChang on Wednesday, 21 February.

Italy's Sofia Goggia won the gold medal, Ragnhild Mowinckel of Norway took the silver, and the bronze medalist was Lindsey Vonn of the United States.

Qualification

A total of up to 320 alpine skiers qualified across all eleven events. Athletes qualified for this event by having met the A qualification standard only, which meant having 80 or less FIS Points and being ranked in the top 500 in the Olympic FIS points list. The Points list takes into average the best results of athletes per discipline during the qualification period (1 July 2016 to 21 January 2018). Countries received additional quotas by having athletes ranked in the top 30 of the current World Cup season (two per gender maximum, overall across all events). After the distribution of B standard quotas (to nations competing only in the slalom and giant slalom events), the remaining quotas were distributed using the Olympic FIS Points list, with each athlete only counting once for qualification purposes. A country could only enter a maximum of four athletes for the event.

Results
The race was started at 11:00 local time, (UTC+9).

References

Women's alpine skiing at the 2018 Winter Olympics